Edward Kevin McGrady (3 June 1935 – 11 November 2013) was an Irish nationalist politician of the Social Democratic and Labour Party (SDLP), who was the  Member of Parliament (MP) for South Down from 1987 to 2010.

McGrady was also a  Member of the Northern Ireland Assembly (MLA) for  South Down from 1998 to 2003.

Early life 
Born in Downpatrick, County Down, Northern Ireland, one of eleven children, McGrady was educated at St Patrick's Grammar School, Downpatrick and at Belfast Technical College, where he trained as a chartered accountant, subsequently entering his family's accountancy firm.

Political career 
McGrady entered politics in 1961 as an Independent Nationalist councillor on Downpatrick Urban Council, serving as chairman from 1964 until the council was replaced by Down District Council in 1973.

In the late 1960s he joined the National Democrats and stood for the party in the 1969 election to the Parliament of Northern Ireland in East Down, losing to the sitting MP and future Prime Minister of Northern Ireland Brian Faulkner.

In 1970 he became a founder member of the Social Democratic and Labour Party (SDLP), later serving as its first chairman (from 1971–1973). He sat on Down District Council from 1973 to 1989, serving as chairman from 1974–1975 and was also elected to all three regional assemblies in 1973, 1975 and 1982 representing South Down. In the 1973 power-sharing executive he was appointed as Head of the Department of Executive Planning and Co-ordination, serving from January to May 1974.

In Westminster elections he contested South Down unsuccessfully in 1979, 1983 and at the by-election of January 1986, losing on each occasion to Enoch Powell, the sitting MP. He succeeded at the fourth attempt in the general election of 1987 and held the seat until retiring in 2010. His tenure was briefly threatened in the mid-1990s when the Boundary Commission suggested merging much of his constituency with the neighbouring Newry and Armagh constituency to form a new 'Newry and Mourne' constituency. This was overturned during a local review, which preserved his seat and actually removed more Unionist sections such as Dromore. McGrady's support held solid over the years despite talk of a slippage, and this was reinforced in the 2005 Westminster election with his re-election to the House of Commons.

McGrady formerly sat on the Northern Ireland Policing Board and was a member of the Northern Ireland Assembly between 1998 and 2003.

On 25 February 2010, McGrady announced that he would stand down at the 2010 General Election.

McGrady continued to be chairperson of the Lecale Branch of the SDLP.

References

External links 

Guardian Politics – Ask Aristotle: Eddie McGrady MP
TheyWorkForYou.com – Eddie McGrady MP

1935 births
2013 deaths
Social Democratic and Labour Party MLAs
National Democratic Party (Northern Ireland) politicians
Members of Down District Council
Members of the Parliament of the United Kingdom for County Down constituencies (since 1922)
UK MPs 1987–1992
UK MPs 1992–1997
UK MPs 1997–2001
UK MPs 2001–2005
UK MPs 2005–2010
Social Democratic and Labour Party MPs (UK)
Members of the Northern Ireland Assembly 1973–1974
Members of the Northern Ireland Constitutional Convention
Northern Ireland MPAs 1982–1986
Members of the Northern Ireland Forum
Northern Ireland MLAs 1998–2003
People from Downpatrick
People educated at St Patrick's Grammar School, Downpatrick
Politicians from County Down
Junior ministers of the 1974 Northern Ireland Assembly
Social Democratic and Labour Party councillors